Outside the Law is a 1930 American Pre-Code  crime film directed by Tod Browning and starring Edward G. Robinson. The picture is a remake of the 1920 film of the same name, starring Lon Chaney which was also directed by Browning.

Plot
Robinson plays the ruthless boss of a criminal gang, willing to do anything to prevent a rival gangster from pulling off a bank robbery on 'his' patch.

Cast

References

External links

1930 films
1930 crime films
American crime films
American black-and-white films
Films directed by Tod Browning
Universal Pictures films
Sound film remakes of silent films
Remakes of American films
1930s English-language films
Films with screenplays by Garrett Fort
1930s American films